Jørgen Vandborg Rasmussen (born 14 July 1945) is a Danish former football (soccer) player, who played 29 games for the Danish national team from 1971 to 1975, and represented Denmark at the 1972 Summer Olympics. Born in Randers, Rasmussen played as a defender for Randers Freja.

External links
Danish national team profile
Haslund.info profile

1945 births
Living people
Danish men's footballers
Denmark international footballers
Footballers at the 1972 Summer Olympics
Olympic footballers of Denmark
Association football defenders
People from Randers
Sportspeople from the Central Denmark Region